Wilson Enrique Pérez Pérez (born August 9, 1967) is a retired Colombian football defender who was capped 47 times and scored 3 international goals for the Colombia national team between 1989 and 1997, including three matches at the 1994 World Cup.

Pérez started his professional playing career in 1985 with Atletico Junior, then was transferred to America de Cali where he was part of the successful team that won several championships. In 1997, he joined Deportivo Unicosta.

From 1998 onwards he played single seasons with Independiente Medellín, América de Cali, Millonarios and finally Atlético Junior in 2001.

On the international stage, Pérez played in the 1994 FIFA World Cup, he also played in two editions of the Copa América in 1989 and 1993.

Titles

References

External links

1967 births
Living people
Colombian footballers
Atlético Junior footballers
América de Cali footballers
Millonarios F.C. players
Independiente Medellín footballers
Categoría Primera A players
Colombia under-20 international footballers
Colombia international footballers
1989 Copa América players
1993 Copa América players
1994 FIFA World Cup players
Association football defenders
Footballers from Barranquilla